Leszek of Dobrzyń (pl: Leszek dobrzyński; bef. 1302 – bef. 10 July 1316), was a Polish prince member of the House of Piast and Duke of Dobrzyń during 1312–1316 with his brothers.

He was the eldest son of Siemowit of Dobrzyń and Anastasia Lvovna of Halych–Volhynia.

Life
The only known fact about him was his mention in the testimony of Jan of Kisielew during the Polish-Teutonic trial in Warsaw in 1339; because this is the only contemporary source who named him, his existence is a matter of dispute between historians. If he was a real person, certainly died young, in or before 1316, still under the regency of his mother and uncle Władysław I.

Notes

References
O. Balzer: Genealogia Piastów, Akademia Umiejętności, Kraków 1895, pp. 361–362 (Wielkopolska Biblioteka Cyfrowa, pp. 370–371/582 (in Polish) [retrieved 16 February 2015]).
K. Jasiński: Rodowód Piastów małopolskich i kujawskich, Wydawnictwo Historyczne, Poznań – Wrocław 2001, pp. 172–173.
S. A. Sroka: Leszek, [in:] K. Ożóg, S. Szczur (ed.), Piastowie. Leksykon biograficzny, Wydawnictwo Literackie, Kraków 1999, p. 243.

1300s births
1316 deaths
People whose existence is disputed
Piast dynasty